Hookey is a surname. Notable people with the surname include:

Gordon Hookey (born 1961), Australian aboriginal artist
Lee Hookey (born 1979), Australian rugby league player
Scott Hookey (born 1967), Australian cricketer

See also
Hooker (surname)